Enzo Nicolás Ferrario Arguello (born 3 March 2000) is a Chilean professional footballer who plays as a centre back for Chilean club La Serena on loan from Unión La Calera.

Career

Universidad Catolica
Ferrario debuted the year 2020 in the match against Everton in Estadio Sausalito, on the following date.

Career statistics

Club

References

External links
 
 

2000 births
Living people
Soccer players from Chicago
Citizens of Chile through descent
Chilean footballers
Chile youth international footballers
Club Deportivo Universidad Católica footballers
Deportes La Serena footballers
Chilean Primera División players
Association football forwards
Naturalized citizens of Chile